Paul Léon Jourdain (28 October 1878 – 26 March 1948) was a French industrialist and politician who was a deputy from 1919 to 1927 and a senator from 1927 to 1944. He was Minister of Labor in 1919–21 and for a brief period in 1924. He was Minister of Pensions from 1925–26.

Early years

Paul Léon Jourdain was born on 28 October 1878 in Altkirch, Alsace-Lorraine, then part of the German Empire.
He attended the Lycée Jansonde-Sailly for his secondary education, then joined the 119th infantry regiment in Le Havre for his military service.
He attended the École Supérieure de Commerce in Lyon, from which he graduated in 1902.
He worked for a machinery firm in Bourgoin, then worked in the silk industry in Lyon.
When his elder brother died in 1911 he returned to Altkirch to take over management of the family business, the Établissements Filature et Tissage X. Jourdain (X. Jordan Spinning and Weaving establishments), which had been founded in 1827 by his grandfather, Xavier Jourdain.

At the start of World War I (1914–18) Jourdain tried to reach France but was arrested by the German military authorities on 4 August 1914.
On 7 August 1914 he was released by French troops. 
Soon after he was assigned assistant military attache to the French embassy in Bern.
On 14 November 1918 he was named military administrator of the Altkirch and Dannemarie territories.

National Politics

On 16 November 1919 Jourdain was elected deputy for Haut-Rhin.
He was made the president of the chamber's Commission d'Assurance et de Prévoyance Sociales.
He was appointed Minister of Labor  on 2 December 1919 in the cabinet of Georges Clemenceau, and retained this post in the subsequent cabinets of Alexandre Millerand and Georges Leygues, leaving office on 16 January 1921.
In 1920 Jourdain became mayor of Altkirch, holding office throughout the inter-war years.
General strikes broke out across France in May 1920.
Jourdain tried to mediate a solution, while Millerand imposed repressive measures.

Jourdain was the principal author of the first French social insurance bill, which was presented to the chamber by his successor as Minister of Labor,  Charles Daniel-Vincent.
The bill was controversial and was not passed, but established the basis for future bills of a similar nature.
It included insurance for illness, maternity, death, disability and old age, and applied to all workers in commerce, industry and agriculture.

Jourdain was reelected to the chamber of deputies on 11 May 1924.
He was Minister of Labor in the short-lived cabinet of Frédéric François-Marsal from 9–14 June 1924.
He was Minister of Pensions in the three successive cabinets of Aristide Briand from 28 November 1925 to 19 July 1926.
These cabinets, which tried without success to solve the financial crisis, included members with a range of political views.
Georges Mandel said of Jourdain and Leygues that they "had adopted such contradictory policies that they could not be said to represent any."

On 9 January 1927 Jourdain was elected to the Senate and joined the Democratic and Radical Union.
He was reelected in the second round on 20 October 1935.
He was appointed vice president of the Senate on 11 January 1940.
On 10 July 1940 he voted in favor of the constitutional law that gave full powers to Marshal Philippe Pétain.
He died in Paris on 26 March 1948 at the age of 69.

Publications

Notes

Sources

1878 births
Emlyon Business School alumni
People from Altkirch
People from Alsace-Lorraine
Politicians from Grand Est
Democratic Republican Alliance politicians
French Ministers of Labour and Social Affairs
French Ministers of Veterans Affairs
Members of the 12th Chamber of Deputies of the French Third Republic
Members of the 13th Chamber of Deputies of the French Third Republic
French Senators of the Third Republic
Senators of Haut-Rhin
1948 deaths
Emigrants from the German Empire to France